This Is a Robbery: The World's Biggest Art Heist is a 2021 American documentary miniseries about the 1990 robbery of the Isabella Stewart Gardner Museum in Boston. The four-part series was directed by Colin Barnicle, who also produced alongside his brother Nick Barnicle. The series was produced over a seven-year period, beginning in 2014. It was released on Netflix on April 7, 2021, receiving generally positive reviews from critics.

Episodes

Reception 
For the series, review aggregator Rotten Tomatoes reported an approval rating of 81% based on 16 reviews, with an average rating of 7.4/10. The website's critics consensus reads, "This is a Robbery may not be the world's most innovative docuseries, but a fascinating subject and an acute attention to detail make for a riveting watch." Metacritic gave the series a weighted average score of 70 out of 100 based on 13 critic reviews, indicating "generally favorable reviews".

References

External links
 
 

2021 American television series debuts
2021 American television series endings
2020s American documentary television series
Documentary television series about art
Documentary television series about crime in the United States
English-language Netflix original programming
Netflix original documentary television series
Art crime